Barbara Benary (April 7, 1946 – March 17, 2019) was an American composer and ethnomusicologist specializing in Indonesian and Indian music.

Benary composed music for a number of theatrical productions at La MaMa Experimental Theatre Club during the 1970s. She composed music for the ETC Company of La MaMa's repertory production of The Only Jealousy of Emer, which was produced during the early 1970s at La MaMa's East Village theater and on tour. She composed music for Gauntlet or the Moon's on Fire, written and directed by John Braswell and produced at La MaMa in 1976.

In 1976, she co-founded Gamelan Son of Lion with Philip Corner and Daniel Goode. She constructed most of the group's instruments. Benary performed with Gamelan Son of Lion in a production called 1001 Instruments You've Never Seen or Heard at La MaMa in 1979. Her major works include two shadow puppet operas entitled Karna and The Story of Esther.

Personal life
Barbara Benary was born in 1946 in Bay Shore, NY. Daughter of Harold and Blanche Benary. She received a B.A. from Sarah Lawrence College in Bronxville, NY and an M.A. and Ph.D. from Wesleyan University in Middletown, CT where her areas of specialization were musics of India and Indonesia. She married woodwind player and instrument designer Steven Silverstein in 1977. She died in 2019, aged 72, from Parkinson's disease and is survived by her husband Steve and daughter Lyra Samara Silverstein.

References

External links
The Norton/Grove Dictionary of Woman Composers (pg 57). Julie Anne Sadie and Rhian Samuel. W.W. Norton & Co (1995) 
Rock Happens – Barbara Benary blasts beyond bygone bashfulness with brass and backbeat, The Village Voice, November 29, 2005.
"Barbara Benary: Mother of Lion" a conversation with Frank J. Oteri published on NewMusicBox, February 1, 2011

1946 births
2019 deaths
20th-century classical composers
21st-century classical composers
American women classical composers
American classical composers
American ethnomusicologists
Gamelan musicians
Place of birth missing
Place of death missing
Neurological disease deaths in the United States
Deaths from Parkinson's disease
21st-century American composers
20th-century American women musicians
20th-century American musicians
20th-century American composers
21st-century American women musicians
American women anthropologists
20th-century women composers
21st-century women composers